M40 and M41 are both gearboxes produced by Koping Engineering for Volvo and used in Volvo Duett, Volvo Valp, Volvo Amazon, Volvo 142 and many more. It is a four speed gearbox. It was also available in s a stronger version called M400 and a three speed version called M30.

Gear Ratios

References

Volvo Cars
Automobile transmissions